Lusitanos XV are a Portuguese professional rugby union representative team based in Lisbon which was created in September 2013 to compete in the 2013–14 European Challenge Cup. It was announced by the Rugby governing body ERC on 2 September that the Portuguese team would hold their home games at Estádio Nacional. However, all their home games were played at the Portuguese national rugby teams home stadium of Estádio Universitário de Lisboa.

The team was coached by national team coach Frederico Sousa.

In 2021 the team entered the Rugby Europe Super Cup, representing Portugal in an eight-team pan-European competition for clubs from non-Six Nations countries. The team reached the final, played in May 2022.

First season
The team was formed to represent Portugal in the Amlin Challenge Cup after the Spanish representatives Olympus Rugby XV withdrew from the competition. The first game was held on 10 October 2013, against Stade Français, a game which they lost 61–3 at Stade Jean-Bouin.

Fixtures

Pool five table

Second season
The team was formed to represent Portugal in the 2021–2022 Rugby Europe Super Cup. The team has only players based in Portugal and the following players are the ones who played, either as starters or subs, in at least one match.

Current squad
Head Coach:  Patrice Lagisquet
 Caps Updated: 11 August 2021

See also
 Rugby union in Portugal
 Portugal national rugby union team

References

External links
ERC Rugby Profile

Portuguese rugby union teams
Rugby clubs established in 2013
2013 establishments in Portugal
Sport in Lisbon
EPCR Challenge Cup
2013–14 European Challenge Cup
Rugby Europe Super Cup